Victor Atanasie Stănculescu (10 May 1928 – 19 June 2016) was a Romanian general during the Communist era. He played a central role in the overthrow of the dictatorship by refusing to carry out the orders of Romanian dictator Nicolae Ceaușescu during the Romanian Revolution of December 1989. His inaction allowed the citizens demonstrating in Bucharest against the government to seize control. In addition, as a defense minister on 25 December 1989, Stanculescu organized the trial and execution of Ceaușescu and his wife, Elena Ceaușescu. 

In 2008, Stănculescu and another general, former Interior Minister Mihai Chițac, were convicted of aggravated manslaughter by the Supreme Court for the shooting deaths of pro-democracy protesters in Timișoara, during the Romanian Revolution of 1989. Sentenced to fifteen years' imprisonment, he was freed in 2014.

He died in 2016 at age 88.

References

1928 births
2016 deaths
People from Tecuci
Romanian generals
Romanian communists
Romanian Ministers of Defence
Romanian people convicted of manslaughter
People of the Romanian Revolution
Prisoners and detainees of Romania
Romanian prisoners and detainees
Carol I National Defence University alumni